Saint Eumenes (or Eumenius) (Greek: Άγιος Εύμένης) was a bishop of Gortyna in Crete during the 7th century (some sources say 3rd century). His feast day is 18 September. He gave up his wealth as a young man and was chosen as bishop of Gortyna. Many miracles are attributed to him: he killed a venomous snake, drove out demons, and healed the sick. He performed miracles at Gortyna, Rome, and in the Thebaid. He died in exile in the Thebaid.

References

External links
 Holy Trinity Orthodox: Eumenes
 Catholic Online: Eumenes

7th-century Byzantine bishops
7th-century Christian saints
Exorcists
Greek Eastern Catholic bishops
Religious leaders from Crete
Byzantine Crete
Saints of medieval Greece
People of medieval Crete
Miracle workers